ELSI may refer to:

 Ethical, Legal and Social Aspects research
 Earth-Life Science Institute  at Tokyo Institute of Technology

See also
 Elsie (disambiguation)